Bounhom Siliphone (born 16 April 1965) is a Laotian sprinter. He competed in the men's 200 metres at the 1992 Summer Olympics.

References

External links
 

1965 births
Living people
Athletes (track and field) at the 1992 Summer Olympics
Laotian male sprinters
Olympic athletes of Laos
Place of birth missing (living people)